Younhee Yang (양윤희, born July 10, 1977) is a contemporary South Korean painter.

Life and work

Yang was born in Seoul, and received her BFA in painting in 2005 from the Parsons School of Design in New York City. In 1998, she studied Oriental painting at the Dankook University in Cheonan, Korea.
Her artist work consists of painting, Installation art, Sculpture and Video art.

Yang's art has been exhibited internationally in Germany, Austria, South Korea, Canada, and in the United States of America. Among the museums and galleries having shown her work are the Korean Broadcasting and Advertisement Museum in Seoul, South Korea, the Gong Art Space gallery in Seoul, South Korea and the DadaPost Galerie in Berlin, Germany. Besides other art publications, the American sculptor Howard McCalebb published the monograph Silent Pictures, The paintings of Yang YounHee about Yang's work in 2012.

Yang works as an independent artist and founded the fine art studio Kunstatelier Younhee Yang, Berlin 2009 in Berlin-Mitte, Germany. The art studio moved from 2012 to 2018 to Berlin-Charlottenburg, Germany. Since 2018, the Kunstatelier YounHee Yang, Berlin is located at Anton-Saefkow-Platz.8, 10369 Berlin, Germany, where it is located at current. Yang supports international social projects through her work.

Yang lives in Seoul, South Korea and in Berlin, Germany.

Exhibitions (selection) 

2016: Sprudelwasser {Reflections}, 2016, AMgallery, Germany
 2014: Silent Pictures II, 2014, DadaPost Galerie, Berlin, Germany
 2013: Photo Op: Photo Opportunity: The Ubiquity of Photography, 2013, DadaPost Galerie, Berlin, Germany
 2012: Gasteig Open Video, Gasteig, Munich, Germany
 2012: Silent Pictures, DadaPost Galerie, Berlin, Germany
 2012: Bilder, Briefe, Noten LXXVI, Autorengalerie 1, Munich, Germany
 2012: Bilder, Briefe, Noten LXXIV, Autorengalerie 1, Munich, Germany
 2011: Gasteig Open Video, Gasteig, Munich, Germany
 2011: Imaginative fairytale, Gong Art Space Gallery, Seoul, South Korea
 2010: Gasteig Open Video, Gasteig, Munich, Germany
 2010: 14th Art Exhibition: Unification of Korea, Korean Broadcasting and Advertisement Museum, Seoul, South Korea
 2010: Scope Miami Artfair, Miami, USA
 2010: Youth Cult, DadaPost Galerie, Berlin, Germany
 2010: Mit den Augen der Anderen, Galerie Magnificat, Berlin, Germany
 2009: Rise & Fall, BOA Life LLC, travelling exhibition, United States
 2009: Personally Political – Contemporary Sensation, Kunsthaus Tacheles, Berlin, Germany
 2008: Imagination and Reality, International Academy for Fine Arts Salzburg, Hallein, Austria
 2005: Threaded, Anna-Maria and Stephen Kellen Gallery, Parsons, New York City, NY, USA
 2004: Obsession, Arnold and Sheila Aronson Gallery, Parsons, New York City, NY, USA

Literature 

 Lemonidou, Eve (2010), International Contemporary Artists, Vol. 1, TCA Publishing, 2010, 
 Tunberg, Despina (2011), International Dictionary of Artists, World Wide Art Books, 2011, 
 McCalebb, Howard (2012), Silent Pictures: The Paintings of YounHee Yang, BOD, 
 McCalebb, Howard (2013), Autobiography as Critique, DadaPost,

References 

1977 births
Living people
Artists from Seoul
Artists from Berlin
Contemporary painters
South Korean women
South Korean contemporary artists
South Korean women artists
20th-century women artists